Luís Filipe Correia Afonso (born 14 January 1990) is a Portuguese road cyclist, who last rode for UCI Continental team .

Major results
2011
 6th Overall Grande Prémio Crédito Agrícola de Costa Azul

References

External links

1990 births
Living people
Portuguese male cyclists
Place of birth missing (living people)